Maganbhai Manibhai Patel (born 25 April 1916) is an Indian politician. He was elected to the Lok Sabha, lower house of the Parliament of India from Sabarkantha in 1989 as a member of the Janata Dal.

References

External links
Official biographical sketch in Parliament of India website

1916 births
Possibly living people
India MPs 1989–1991
Lok Sabha members from Gujarat
Janata Dal politicians
People from Sabarkantha district
Indian National Congress politicians
Janata Party politicians